Harry Oxenham Haslam (January 9, 1874 – December 30, 1945) was a provincial politician from Alberta, Canada. He served as a member of the Legislative Assembly of Alberta from 1935 to 1940, sitting with the Social Credit caucus in government.

References

1874 births
1945 deaths
Alberta Social Credit Party MLAs
People from Summerside, Prince Edward Island